Kalabuda is a village in Garadpur block, Kendrapara, Odisha, India, near the eastern coast.

Location
The Kalabuda (A), Kalabuda (B) and Kalabuda (C) wards are under this village.

History
"Kalabuda" literally means "art hub" from "kala" (art) and "buda" (hub) in Oriya language). It refers to the prevalence of local artisans.

Facilities
Kalabuda hosts a primary school and a high school. The village offers a medical facility, post office, fax facility, and Internet facility. The bridge in the village connecting Korua and Kalabuda is the main communication path in this area.

Notable residents
 Chakradhar Satapathy (former MLA, Patakura)

References

External links

Villages in Kendrapara district